Cold Heaven is a 1991 American supernatural thriller film directed by Nicolas Roeg, and starring Theresa Russell, James Russo, Mark Harmon, Julie Carmen, and Seymour Cassel. Its plot follows a lapsed Catholic woman whose husband inexplicably rises from the dead, profoundly challenging her beliefs. The screenplay, by Allan Scott, is based on the 1983 novel of the same name by Northern Irish-Canadian writer Brian Moore. The film score was by Stanley Myers.

Plot
Marie Davenport, a lapsed Catholic, is having an affair with Dr. Daniel Corvin, unbeknownst to her husband, Dr. Alex Davenport, also a doctor. She intends to break the news to Alex while attending a medical conference with him in Mexico. While swimming in a bay at Acapulco, Alex is struck by a passing motorboat. He is rushed to the hospital with a massive head laceration, but dies during emergency surgery.

The following morning, Marie is notified by the hospital that, prior to Alex's scheduled autopsy, his body inexplicably disappeared. Meanwhile, Daniel learns of Alex's death, and breaks the news of his affair with Marie to his girlfriend, Anna, who is infuriated. Marie returns to her home in Los Angeles while authorities attempt to locate Alex's body. Marie receives an anonymous message—which she presumes is from Daniel—asking her to travel to a hotel in Carmel-by-the-Sea that she has stayed at before, where she first met Daniel.

After visiting the local convent, Marie returns to her hotel room, where she is shocked to find Alex, seemingly alive. Alex recounts his memory of that day, and his waking up in the hospital morgue. Exhausted, Alex falls asleep, and appears to be dead, but later returns to life as he wakes. A flummoxed Marie returns to the church and speaks with Monsignor Cassidy, to whom she recounts her apostasy after her mother died when Marie was a teenager. She also tells him of a vision she had the year before while staying in Carmel-by-the-Sea: While walking along the ocean cliffs near the convent, she became fixated on two ponds below, and witnessed the Virgin Mary emerge from the water, instructing her to inform a priest that a sanctuary be rebuilt for the convent.

Daniel arrives in Carmel-by-the-Sea and meets Marie at the hotel. She explains that Alex has met her there and is apparently alive. Marie reluctantly tells Daniel she cannot be with him, as she still feels a profound connection to Alex. Daniel, though defeated, agrees to perform a medical examination of Alex. The two decide to bring Alex to a hospital in San Francisco due to his declined physical state. Father Niles, a colleague of the Mosnignor, follows them, attempting to speak with Marie, but she denies him. When Daniel leaves for a brief work trip, Marie visits Alex in the hospital, but he reacts violently, vomiting blood. Marie is comforted by Father Niles, who trailed her to the hospital. In Father Niles's confidence, she confesses that she and Daniel orchestrated the boating accident, intending to kill Alex; she interprets Alex's return to life as God giving her a second chance.

After Alex is released from the hospital, he and Marie spend the evening together, but he awakens in the middle of the night, thrashing violently, and his head wound begins inexplicably bleeding again. She phones Father Niles for help and returns to the convent in Carmel-by-the-Sea. There, Sister Martha, a young nun, prays on the cliffside where Marie had her vision the year before. A wind bursts across the cliffs, terrifying Marie, and a cross appears embedded in the cliffside. Meanwhile, Alex wakes alone at the hotel, his head wound miraculously healed.

Marie returns to the hotel, where Daniel arrives moments later, pursuing her. In the hotel room, Marie is met by Alex. The two embrace, as a defeated Daniel departs. Meanwhile, Father Niles, sitting on the edge of the cliff, watches the sun set.

Cast
 Theresa Russell as Marie Davenport 
 Mark Harmon as Dr. Alex Davenport
 James Russo as Daniel Corvin
 Julie Carmen as Anna Corvin 
 Seymour Cassel as Tom Farrelly
 Richard Bradford as Monsignor Cassidy
 Diana Douglas as Mother St. Agnes 
 Talia Shire as Sister Martha 
 Will Patton as Father Niles
 Cástulo Guerra as Dr. DeMencos
 Jeanette Miller as Sister Katarina
 Lenny Von Dohlen as Hotel Clerk (uncredited)

Release

Critical response
Time Out said that "Sadly, for all its technical brilliance and narrative assurance, the film's climactic scenes require an act of faith that no film-maker – Christian, agnostic or atheist – has any right to ask".

Neil Sinyard in Reference Guide to British and Irish Film Directors described it as "disappointing... unusually dour and dry in its treatment of guilt and paranoia".

Peter Rainer of the Los Angeles Times wrote that the film is "ponderous without having much weight; we keep expecting the story to fill out, to achieve a vision that matches Marie’s. But the big storm-tossed finale comes across like cut-rate De Mille. This is a “religious” movie without much religious feeling. Roeg manages to work up a queasy atmosphere of impending dread in the boating scenes and the scenes between Marie and another priest (Will Patton) who keys into her visions.

Home media
Scorpion Releasing released a limited edition Blu-ray of the film on August 19, 2020.

References

External links
 
 
Lawless, Andrew: "Doubt in the Novel – Brian Moore's Cold Heaven", Three Monkeys Online

1990s mystery thriller films
1991 films
American mystery thriller films
American supernatural thriller films
American zombie films
Films about Catholic nuns
Films about Catholic priests
Films about Catholicism
Films about infidelity
Films based on novels by Brian Moore
Films directed by Nicolas Roeg
Films scored by Stanley Myers
Films set in California
Films set in Mexico
Films shot in Mexico
Marian apparitions in film
1990s English-language films
1990s American films